Jordan Calloway is an American actor. He is known for his role as Zach Carter-Schwartz on the Nickelodeon series Unfabulous (2004–2007). Calloway has also had recurring roles on NBC's ER (2005–2006), as well as The CW series Riverdale (2017–2018), and Black Lightning (2018–2021). Since 2022, he has starred as Jake in the CBS action drama, Fire Country.

Early life and education
He is the son of cinematographer Joseph Calloway. Calloway's parents are divorced. He is the youngest of several children. As a child, Calloway had aspirations of becoming a Navy SEAL, while his brother was actually interested in acting. Calloway attended Maranatha High School and graduated in 2009. He played varsity baseball for all four years. He would later attend Azusa Pacific University. He graduated with a degree in TV and film production.

Filmography

Film

Television

Awards and nominations

References

External links
 
 
 

Year of birth missing (living people)
Living people
American male film actors
African-American male actors
21st-century American male actors
American male television actors
Azusa Pacific University alumni
21st-century African-American people